Harry Heinrich Beloro Föll (born 2 March 1998) is a  footballer who plays as an attacking midfielder for German Oberliga Baden-Württemberg club FC 08 Villingen. Born in Germany, he plays for the Philippines national team.

Club career

Oldenburg
In June 2018, Föll joined Regionalliga Nord club Oldenburg in a two-year deal.

Linx
In November 2018, Föll joined Oberliga Baden-Württemberg club Linx until the end of the 2018-19 season.

International career
Föll was born and raised in Germany to a German father and a Filipino mother which made him eligible to play for Germany or the Philippines.

Philippines
In August 2017, he was named in the Philippines' 23-man squad for their 2019 AFC Asian Cup qualifiers against Yemen on 5 September 2017.

In November 2021, he was named in the Philippines' 27-man preliminary squad for the 2020 AFF Championship.

Föll was included in the 25-man squad of the Philippines for 2022 FAS Tri-Nations Series.

He debuted in a 2–0 friendly loss to Malaysia on 23 March 2022.

References

External links
 

1998 births
Living people
People from Offenburg
Sportspeople from Freiburg (region)
Footballers from Baden-Württemberg
Filipino footballers
Philippines international footballers
German footballers
Filipino people of German descent
German sportspeople of Filipino descent
Citizens of the Philippines through descent
Association football midfielders
FC Hansa Rostock players
VfB Oldenburg players
3. Liga players